Rhodognaphalon mossambicense, the East African bombax or wild kapok tree, is a species of flowering plant in the family Malvaceae. It occurs from southeastern Kenya through the coastal and Eastern Arc forests of Tanzania to northern Mozambique and Malawi.

Its seeds are roasted and eaten, either whole or pounded into a powder which is then used in cooking.

References

Bombacoideae
Flora of Mozambique
Flora of Tanzania
Edible nuts and seeds
Taxonomy articles created by Polbot